Hatim Ibrahim, born 1975) is an Egyptian chess player. He was awarded the title of International Master by FIDE in 2011.

Ibrahim qualified for the Chess World Cup 2011, where he was defeated by Shakhriyar Mamedyarov in the first round.

References

External links
 
 
Hatim Ibrahim chess games at 365Chess.com

1975 births
Living people
Egyptian chess players